Lookout Mountain Preserve is a municipal park in the northern part of Phoenix, Arizona. It is supervised and maintained by the Parks and Recreation Department of the City of Phoenix as part of the Phoenix Mountains Preserve system of parks. The preserve offers scenic vistas and trails for hiking and mountain biking.

Geologically, Lookout Mountain is composed of Tertiary basalt flows, Tertiary sediments and basalt breccia.

References 

Parks in Phoenix, Arizona